The genus Cacalia L. is a nomen rejiciendum (rejected name) under the International Code of Nomenclature for algae, fungi, and plants. The type species C. alpina L. has been transferred to Adenostyles alpina (L.) Bluff & Fingerh., and the former species of Cacalia now reside in a few different genera.
Adenostyles
Adenostyles alliariae (Gouan) A. Kern.
Cacalia alliariae Gouan
Adenostyles alpina (L.) Bluff & Fingerh.
Cacalia alpina L.
Adenostyles briquetii Gamisans
Cacalia briquetii (Gamisans) Gamisans
Adenostyles leucophylla (Willd.) Rchb.
Cacalia leucophylla Willd.
Arnoglossum
Arnoglossum atriplicifolium (L.) H.Rob. - Pale Indian Plantain
Cacalia atriplicifolia L.
Cacalia rotundifolia (Raf.) House
Arnoglossum diversifolium (Torr. & Gray) H.Rob. - Variable-leaved Indian Plantain
Cacalia diversifolia Torr. & Gray
Arnoglossum floridanum (Gray) H.Rob. - Florida cacalia
Cacalia floridana Gray
Arnoglossum muehlenbergii (Sch.Bip.) H.Rob. - Great Indian Plantain
Cacalia muehlenbergii (Schultz-Bip.) Fern.
Cacalia reniformis Muhl. ex Willd., non Lam.
Arnoglossum ovatum (Walter) H.Rob. - Ovateleaf cacalia
Cacalia elliottii (Harper) Shinners
Cacalia lanceolata Nutt.
Cacalia ovata Walt.
Cacalia tuberosa Nutt.
Arnoglossum sulcatum (Fernald) H.Rob - Georgia Indian plaintain
Cacalia sulcata Fern.

References

Asteraceae genera
Historically recognized angiosperm genera